Madalena Lucília Iglésias do Vale de Oliveira (born Madalena Lucília Iglésias Doval; 24 October 1939 – 16 January 2018) was a Portuguese actress and singer. She represented Portugal at the Eurovision Song Contest 1966, with the song "Ele e ela".

Filmography
Uma hora de Amor (1964)
Canção da Saudade (1964)
Sarilho de fraldas (1966)

References

External links

1939 births
2018 deaths
20th-century Portuguese actresses
20th-century Portuguese women singers
Portuguese film actresses
Portuguese expatriates in Spain
Actresses from Lisbon
Singers from Lisbon
Eurovision Song Contest entrants for Portugal
Eurovision Song Contest entrants of 1966